Lambert II may refer to:

 Lambert II of Nantes (d. 852)
 Lambert II of Spoleto (c. 880 – 898)
 Lambert II, Count of Louvain (d. 1054)
 Lambert II, Count of Lens (d. 1054)
 Lamberto II da Polenta (d. 1347)